The Royal Institute of British Architects Stirling Prize is a British prize for excellence in architecture. It is named after the architect James Stirling, organised and awarded annually by the Royal Institute of British Architects (RIBA). The Stirling Prize is presented to "the architects of the building that has made the greatest contribution to the evolution of architecture in the past year". The architects must be RIBA members. Until 2014, the building could have been anywhere in the European Union, but since 2015 entries have had to be in the United Kingdom. In the past, the award included a £20,000 prize, but it currently carries no prize money.

The award was founded in 1996, and is considered to be the most prestigious architecture award in the United Kingdom. The Stirling Prize replaced the RIBA Building of the Year Award.

The Stirling Prize is the highest profile British architectural award, and the presentation ceremony has been televised by Channel 4. Six shortlisted buildings are chosen from a long-list of buildings that have received a RIBA National Award. These awards are given to buildings showing "high architectural standards and substantial contribution to the local environment".

In addition to the RIBA Stirling Prize, five other awards are given to buildings on the long-list. In 2015 they consisted of: the RIBA National Award, the RIBA Regional Award, the Manser Medal, the Stephen Lawrence Prize and the RIBA Client of the Year Award. For years prior to 1996, the award was known as the "Building of the Year Award".

In 2000, several architects from Scotland and Wales made claims of metropolitan bias after five out of seven designs shortlisted by judges were located within London. Critics described the list as "London-centric". The chairman of the judges in the contest rejected the claims, saying that the first Stirling Prize was awarded to a building in Salford, Greater Manchester.

On 30 September 2020, RIBA announced that the awards had been postponed until 2021 due to the COVID-19 pandemic. Judges selected the 2021 prize winner from the 2020 shortlist.

Laureates and runners-up
As the "RIBA Building of the Year Award"

See also 
List of architecture prizes

Citations

External links
RIBA Stirling Prize
Channel 4 - Building of the year

Architecture awards
Architecture in the United Kingdom
British awards
Awards established in 1996
1996 establishments in the United Kingdom
Royal Institute of British Architects
Annual events in the United Kingdom